The British Academy of Film and Television Arts (BAFTA) annually hosted the BAFTA Interactive Entertainment Awards for multimedia entertainment between 1998 and 2003.

In 2003, BAFTA announced the award would be split into two separate ceremonies – BAFTA Interactive Awards and BAFTA Games Awards – to take place in February the following year.

The 2004 ceremonies were held on the 1st and 2 March 2005, after which the Interactive Awards were quietly retired, leaving only the Games Awards to return in October 2006.

Accessibility
2002 :  I-Map (website)
2001 : (not awarded)
2000 : (not awarded)
1999 : (not awarded)
1998 : (not awarded)

Audio (awarded as 'Sound' pre-2002)
2002 : Luigi's Mansion (for GameCube)
2001 : Conker's Bad Fur Day (for Nintendo 64)
2000 : Theme Park World (for Windows)
1999 : Grand Theft Auto: London 1969
1998 : Ceremony of Innocence

Best UK Developer
2002 : (not awarded)
2001 : (not awarded)
2000 : BBC Online
1999 : (not awarded)
1998 : Rare

Children's
2002 : (multiple categories)
2001 : (multiple categories)
2000 : (multiple categories)
1999 : Noddy – Let's Get Ready For School
1998 : Star Wars Droidworks

Children's Entertainment
2002 : Disney's Magic Artist Deluxe (for Windows)
2001 : Disney's Tigger's Honey Hunt (for Windows)
2000 : Lego & Steven Spielberg Moviemaker Set (Multi Format)
1999 : (awarded as single category 'Children's')
1998 : (awarded as single category 'Children's')

Children's Learning
2002 : Frankie's Animal Adventures (for Windows)
2001 : Immaterial Bodies (for Windows)
2000 : Lego & Steven Spielberg Moviemaker Set (Multi Format)
1999 : IJsfontein Masters of the Elements
1998 : (awarded as single category 'Children's')

Comedy
2002 : (not awarded)
2001 : (not awarded)
2000 : (not awarded)
1999 : (not awarded)
1998 : MindGym

Computer Programming
2002 : (not awarded)
2001 : (not awarded)
2000 : (not awarded)
1999 : Aliens versus Predator (video game)
1998 : Gran Turismo

Design
2002 : (not awarded)
2001 : (not awarded)
2000 : (not awarded)
1999 : Wip3out
1998 : ShiftControl

E-Zine
2002 : Wellness Heaven Awards
2001 : (not awarded)
2000 : (not awarded)
1999 : The BirdGuides website
1998 : (not awarded)

Enhancement of Linear Media
2002 : Memento (DVD)
2001 : Walking With Beasts (Interactive TV)
2000 : BBC Wimbledon / Golf Sports Coverage (Digital TV)
1999 : (not awarded)
1998 : (not awarded)

Entertainment Website
2002 : (not awarded)
2001 : Tiny Planets (website)
2000 : Cartoon Network UK (website)
1999 : Jamba
1998 : (not awarded)

Factual
2002 : Time Team (website)
2001 : Marconi Online Museum (website)
2000 : BBC History Site (website)
1999 : CNN.com/Coldwar
1998 : Redshift 3

Games
2002 : (multiple categories)
2001 : (multiple categories)
2000 : (multiple categories)
1999 : The Legend of Zelda: Ocarina of Time
1998 : GoldenEye 007

Games – Console
2002 : Halo: Combat Evolved (for Xbox)
2001 : Gran Turismo 3: A-Spec (for PlayStation 2)
2000 : MediEvil II (for PlayStation)
1999 : (awarded as single category 'Games')
1998 : (awarded as single category 'Games')

Games – Mobile Device
2002 : SMS Chess by Purple Software (for mobile phone)
2001 : Tony Hawk's Pro Skater 2 (for Game Boy Advance)
2000 : Pokémon: Yellow Version: Special Pikachu Edition (for Game Boy Color)
1999 : (awarded as single category 'Games')
1998 : (awarded as single category 'Games')

Games – Multiplayer
2002 : Halo: Combat Evolved (for Xbox)
2001 : (not awarded)
2000 : (not awarded)
1999 : (awarded as single category 'Games')
1998 : (awarded as single category 'Games')

Games – Networked
2002 : (not awarded)
2001 : Phantasy Star Online (for Dreamcast)
2000 : (awarded as 'Games – Mobile or Networked)
1999 : (awarded as single category 'Games')
1998 : (awarded as single category 'Games')

Games – PC
2002 : Neverwinter Nights (for Windows)
2001 : Max Payne (for Windows)
2000 : Deus Ex (for Windows)
1999 : (awarded as single category 'Games')
1998 : (awarded as single category 'Games')

Game – Sports
2002 : Geoff Crammond's Grand Prix 4 (for Windows)
2001 : ISS Pro Evolution 2
2000 : Sydney 2000 (for Windows or Dreamcast)
1999 : (awarded as single category 'Games')
1998 : (awarded as single category 'Games')

Innovative Game
2002 : (not awarded)
2001 : (not awarded)
2000 : (not awarded)
1999 : The Legend of Zelda: Ocarina of Time
1998 : (not awarded)

Interactive Arts
2002 : Body Movies
2001 : Sodaplay (website)
2000 : Watched And Measured
1999 : (not awarded)
1998 : (not awarded)

Interactive TV
2002 : MTV Ad-Break Tennis
2001 : (not awarded)
2000 : (not awarded)
1999 : (not awarded)
1998 : (not awarded)

Interactivity
2002 : Pikmin (for GameCube)
2001 : Black and White (for Windows)
2000 : Onlinecaroline.com (website)
1999 : The Legend of Zelda: Ocarina of Time
1998 : Stagestruck (awarded as 'Interactive Treatment')

Interface Design
2002 : Habitat (website)
2001 : Eyes Only (for Windows)
2000 : MTV2 (website)
1999 : (not awarded)
1998 : (not awarded)

Learning
2002 : (multiple categories)
2001 : (multiple categories)
2000 : Immaterial Bodies
1999 : Masters of the Elements
1998 : Lifting the Weight

Lifestyle And Leisure
2002 : (not awarded)
2001 : FreQuency (for PlayStation 2)
2000 : (not awarded)
1999 : (not awarded)
1998 : (not awarded)

Moving Images
2002 : (not awarded)
2001 : Black and White (for Windows)
2000 : Perfect Dark (for Nintendo 64)
1999 : Driver
1998 : Ceremony of Innocence

Music
2002 : (not awarded)
2001 : Shogun Total War: Warlord Edition (for Windows)
2000 : Imperium Galactica II (for Windows)
1999 : (not awarded)
1998 : (not awarded)

News
2002 : (not awarded)
2001 : BBC News Online (website)
2000 : BBC News Online (website)
1999 : BBC News Online (website)
1998 : BBC News Online (website)

Offline Learning
2002 : Antarctic Waves (for Windows)
2001 : (not awarded)
2000 : (not awarded)
1999 : (awarded as single category 'Learning')
1998 : (awarded as single category 'Learning')

Online Entertainment
2002 : Lexus Minority Report Experience (website)
2001 : (not awarded)
2000 : (not awarded)
1999 : (not awarded)
1998 : (not awarded)

Online Learning
2002 : Commanding Heights Online (website)
2001 : Grid Club (website)
2000 : Homework High (website)
1999 : (awarded as single category 'Learning')
1998 : (awarded as single category 'Learning')

Special awards
2002 : Ian Livingstone (BAFTA Interactive Award)
2001 :Championship Manager: Season 00/01 (for Windows) (amazon.co.uk Award)
2000 : David Bowie (Berners-Lee Award)
1999 : Toby Gard & Paul Douglas (Berners-Lee Award)
1998 : Peter Kindersley (Berners-Lee Award)

Sports & Leisure
2002 : The Famous Grouse Experience
2001 : (not awarded)
2000 : (not awarded)
1999 : (not awarded)
1998 : (not awarded)

Technical Innovation
2002 : Tate Multimedia Tours
2001 : SSEYO Koan Interactive Audio Platform
2000 : Sketchaphone (WAP/website)
1999 : (not awarded)
1998 : (not awarded)

References

Interactive Entertainment
Video game awards
Internet in the United Kingdom
Awards established in 1998
1998 establishments in the United Kingdom
Web awards
BAFTA Interactive Awards